MaineToday Media is a privately owned publisher of daily and weekly newspapers in the U.S. state of Maine, based in the state's largest city, Portland. It includes the Portland Press Herald and Maine Sunday Telegram, the state's largest newspaper.

Properties 
MaineToday's daily newspapers include the Portland Press Herald and Maine Sunday Telegram in Portland, the Kennebec Journal in Augusta and the Morning Sentinel in Waterville.

The company also owns The Coastal Journal, a weekly newspaper in Bath. It previously published The Community Leader, a weekly in Falmouth, and The Maine Switch, a lifestyle and entertainment magazine in Portland.

MaineToday also owns local Maine websites dedicated to classified advertising, entertainment listings, parenting and travel, as well as a Yellow Pages site and a digital marketing service.

Gannett and Blethen 

MaineToday's newspaper properties were, for most of the 20th century, the core of Guy Gannett Communications, a local family-owned business not related to the larger Gannett chain.

The company was founded by its namesake, Guy P. Gannett, in 1921, and managed by a family trust from 1954 until 1998, when the trust left the media business. It sold its television stations to Sinclair Broadcasting.

The Seattle Times Company, an independent publisher of three dailies and several weeklies in Washington state, purchased all of Guy Gannett's newspapers for a price reported at $213 million.

Guy Gannett managers said they sold to the Times because of shared values—both companies were fourth-generation family-owned news organizations: "Of all the companies in the newspaper business, The Seattle Times is one most like our company in the sense of independence, of family ownership, and commitment to the community," said Guy Gannett spokesman Tim O'Meara.

The Times set up an "independent subsidiary" to run its Maine operations, called Blethen Maine Newspapers. The subsidiary was named after Alden J. Blethen, ancestor of The Seattle Times owners, who was born in Knox County and grew up in Waldo County, Maine, before becoming editor in chief and owner of the Seattle Daily Times in 1896.

Sale to MaineToday Media 

After more than a year on the market, on June 15, 2009, the Blethen papers were sold to MaineToday Media, Inc., headed by Maine native Richard L. Connor, publisher of Times Leader in Wilkes-Barre, Pennsylvania, with financing from HM Capital Partners and Citizens Bank. The company established a headquarters at One City Center in downtown Portland.

Financial details of the sale were not released, though a Seattle Times report estimated them at less than half the $213 million paid in 1998. At the time of the sale, a spokesman for The Seattle Times Company said the Maine newspapers "provided a very good return during our 10-year tenure. We were very reluctant to sell and are very sad about it. If it were not for the severe recession, we would not have done so."

As part of the sale, Portland Newspaper Guild members took a 10 percent pay cut in exchange for 15 percent ownership in MaineToday Media.

MaineToday promised that it could put its newspapers on a sound financial footing, but over the next two and a half years there were more than 160 job cuts at the Press Herald, the company was sued for failing to pay a paper bill, and the local guild president said his members "feel their investment in Rich Connor was squandered and they're angry about it. We feel the company was mismanaged."

Connor stepped down as publisher of the newspapers for undisclosed reasons in October, 2011. In April 2013, Connor was accused of misappropriation of about $530,000 of the newspapers' funds for personal expenses and unauthorized salary increases for himself. In a memo to company employees, MaineToday Media publisher Lisa DeSisto wrote the newspapers were paid $537,988.68  under the company’s employee theft insurance policy, to recoup money that she wrote "Connor took for unauthorized personal use."

In January 2012, Massachusetts businessman Aaron Kusher, who had previously made an unsuccessful $200 million bid to buy The Boston Globe, led a group that bought a controlling interest in MaineToday for an undisclosed price. The newspapers became primarily owned by financier Donald Sussman. In 2015, Sussman sold MaineToday to Reade Brower, a Maine printer and newspaper owner. Brower purchased the Sun Media Group, parent of the Sun Journal in Lewiston, in 2017.

Editorial policy
The MaineToday editorial board announced in their August 31, 2014, editorial that they would no longer endorse candidates for political office, citing a desire to avoid appearing partisan and telling readers how to vote. They stated they would continue to take positions on referendums, people's veto, and bond questions.

References

Further reading

External links
MaineToday.com
Kennebec Journal - kjonline.com
Morning Sentinel - onlinesentinel.com
Portland Press Herald and Maine Sunday Telegram - pressherald.com

Mass media in Portland, Maine
Mass media companies established in 2009
2009 establishments in Maine